Hertsa Raion or Hertza Raion (translit.: Hertsaiivs'kyi raion) was an administrative raion (district) in the southern part of Chernivtsi Oblast in western Ukraine, on the Romanian border. It was one of the three raions of Ukraine with the majority of ethnic Romanian population. The raion was abolished on 18 July 2020 as part of the administrative reform of Ukraine, which reduced the number of raions of Chernivtsi Oblast to three. The area of Hertsa Raion was merged into Chernivtsi Raion. The last estimate of the raion population was 

At the time of disestablishment, the raion consisted of two hromadas, Hertsa urban hromada with the administration in Hertsa and Ostrytsia rural hromada with the administration in the selo of Ostrytsia.

History
The Hertsa region was part of the Principality of Moldavia since its founding in the 14th century and after the union of Moldavia with Wallachia in 1859 it became part of Romania, which gained its formal independence in 1877.

The region was occupied by the Soviet Union in 1940 following the signing of the Molotov–Ribbentrop Pact with Nazi Germany, and was added to the Ukrainian Soviet Socialist Republic. It was recaptured by Romania in 1941 in the course of Axis attack on the Soviet Union in the Second World War, but was recaptured again by the Soviet Army in 1944.  The annexation was confirmed by the Paris Peace Treaties in 1947 between the USSR and the Communist Romania.

The fact that neither the secret protocol (appendix) of the Molotov–Ribbentrop Pact, which specified the expansionist claims of both sides, nor the June 1940 Soviet Ultimatum demanding from Romania the adjacent territory of Northern Bukovina and Bessarabia included Hertsa makes the capture by the Soviets controversial in Romania. Furthermore, unlike Bessarabia and Northern Bukovina, the region had not been a part of Imperial Russia or Austria-Hungary before World War I, but had been a part of Romania and one of its predecessor states, Moldavia, before that.

In 1962, the raion was merged into Hlyboka Raion, and in 1991, was reinstated again.

Demographics

In 1930, the region had a population of 30,082, of which 27,919 (92.8%) Romanians, 1,931 (6.4%) Jews and 232 (0.8%) people of other ethnicities.

In 2001, the population of Hertsa Raion was 32,316, of which 29,554 or 91.5% were Romanians, 1,616 or 5.0% were Ukrainians, 756 or 2.3% Moldovans (out of which 511 self-identified their language as Moldovan and 237 as Romanian), 0.9% Russians and 0.3% of other ethnicities (''see: Ukrainian Census, 2001).

Localities
Hertsa Raion was composed of 1 city and 13 incorporated localities, containing a total of 24 villages (Romanian names listed in brackets):

Герца  Hertsa (Herţa)
Байраки  Bairaky (Mogoșești)
Буківка  Bukivka (Poieni, Poieni-Bucovina, Puieni)
Годинівка  Hodynivka (Godinești, Godânești)
Горбова  Horbova (Horbova)
Хряцька  Khriatska (Hreațca)
Куликівка  Kulykіvka (Colincăuți, Culiceni)
Лунка  Lunka (Lunca)
Молниця  Molnytsia (Molnița)
Остриця  Ostrytsia (Ostrița, Stârcești)  
Петрашівка  Petrashivka (Mihoreni, Petrașivca)
Тернавка  Ternavka (Târnauca)
Цурень  Tsuren (Țureni)
Велика Буда  Velyka Buda (Buda Mare)

The 10 unincorporated villages are:

Банчени  Bancheny (Bănceni)
Дяківці  Diakіvtsі (Probotești)
Круп'янське  Krupianske (Pasat)
Луковиця  Lukovytsia (Lucovița, Lucovița Moldovenească)
Мала Буда  Mala Buda (Buda Mică)
Маморниця  Mamornytsia (Mamornița, Mamornița Ucraineană) 	 	
Могилівка  Mohylivka (Movila)
Підвальне  Pіdval'ne (Becești)
Радгоспівка  Radhospivka (Vama) 	
Великосілля  Velykosillia (Pilipăuți, Satul Mare)

See also
Subdivisions of Ukraine
Romanians in Ukraine
Hertsa region

References

External links

 Hertsaivskyi Raion -  official website
 România Liberă newspaper  - book review

Former raions of Chernivtsi Oblast
Romanian communities in Ukraine
1991 establishments in Ukraine
Ukrainian raions abolished during the 2020 administrative reform